Oleh Leonidovych "Oleg" Shafarenko (born October 31, 1981) is a Ukrainian former ice hockey player. He last played for HC Donbass of the Ukrainian Hockey Championship.

Career highlights
2008–2009 World Championship (Div. 1B) Silver Medal
2009–2010 World Championship (Div. 1A) Silver Medal
2010–2011 Continental Cup Champion; World Championship (Div. 1B) Silver Medal

Transactions

References

External links

1981 births
Living people
Sportspeople from Kyiv
HC Shakhtyor Soligorsk players
Sokil Kyiv players
Ukrainian ice hockey forwards
HC Dinamo Minsk players
HC Donbass players
HK Mogilev players
Yunost Minsk players
Ukraine men's national ice hockey team coaches